This is a list of local councils of Malta which have standing links to local communities in other countries known as "town twinning" (usually in Europe) or "sister cities" (usually in the rest of the world).

A
Attard

 Élancourt, France
 Pieve Emanuele, Italy

B
Birkirkara
 Grosseto, Italy

Birgu

 Belvì, Italy
 Saint-Tropez, France

F
Floriana
 Macerata, Italy

G
Għajnsielem

 Bethlehem, Palestine
 Tolfa, Italy

Għarb

 Castrolibero, Italy
 Massafra, Italy
 Torrent, Spain
 Tortona, Italy

Għasri
 Ottenschlag, Austria

Gżira
 Wałbrzych, Poland

H
Hamrun
 Scilla, Italy

K
Kalkara
 Crespellano (Valsamoggia), Italy

Kirkop
 Rousset, France

M
Marsa
 Bridgwater, England, United Kingdom

Marsaskala is a member of the Douzelage, a town twinning association of towns across the European Union, alongside with:

 Agros, Cyprus
 Altea, Spain
 Asikkala, Finland
 Bad Kötzting, Germany
 Bellagio, Italy
 Bundoran, Ireland
 Chojna, Poland
 Granville, France
 Holstebro, Denmark
 Houffalize, Belgium
 Judenburg, Austria
 Kőszeg, Hungary
 Meerssen, Netherlands
 Niederanven, Luxembourg
 Oxelösund, Sweden
 Preveza, Greece
 Rokiškis, Lithuania
 Rovinj, Croatia
 Sesimbra, Portugal
 Sherborne, England, United Kingdom
 Sigulda, Latvia
 Siret, Romania
 Škofja Loka, Slovenia
 Sušice, Czech Republic
 Tryavna, Bulgaria
 Türi, Estonia
 Zvolen, Slovakia

Marsaxlokk
 Cadeo, Italy

Mdina
 Zaragoza, Spain

Mellieħa

 Adenau, Germany
 Ayia Napa, Cyprus
 Cavriglia, Italy

Mġarr
 Mathi, Italy

Mosta

 Millbrae, United States
 Ragusa, Italy

Munxar
 Ragalna, Italy

N
Nadur is a member of the Charter of European Rural Communities, a town twinning association across the European Union. Nadur also has two other twin towns.

Charter of European Rural Communities
 Bienvenida, Spain
 Bièvre, Belgium
 Bucine, Italy
 Cashel, Ireland
 Cissé, France
 Desborough, England, United Kingdom
 Esch (Haaren), Netherlands
 Hepstedt, Germany
 Ibănești, Romania
 Kandava (Tukums), Latvia
 Kannus, Finland
 Kolindros, Greece
 Lassee, Austria
 Medzev, Slovakia
 Moravče, Slovenia
 Næstved, Denmark
 Nagycenk, Hungary
 Ockelbo, Sweden
 Pano Lefkara, Cyprus
 Põlva, Estonia
 Samuel (Soure), Portugal
 Slivo Pole, Bulgaria
 Starý Poddvorov, Czech Republic
 Strzyżów, Poland
 Tisno, Croatia
 Troisvierges, Luxembourg
 Žagarė (Joniškis), Lithuania
Other
 Baveno, Italy
 Cicciano, Italy

Naxxar

 Baveno, Italy
 Cicciano, Italy

P
Paola
 Calcinaia, Italy

Pembroke

 Pembroke, Wales, United Kingdom
 Pembroke Dock, Wales, United Kingdom
 Roccalumera, Italy

Q
Qala

 Malfa, Italy
 Lanciano, Italy
 Leni, Italy
 Santa Marina Salina, Italy

R
Rabat
 Tarquinia, Italy

S
Saint Paul's Bay
 Agios Pavlos, Greece

San Ġwann
 Monreale, Italy

San Lawrenz
 Colle Umberto, Italy

Sannat
 Pisoniano, Italy

Santa Luċija

 Carlentini, Italy
 Gabiano, Italy
 Gusu (Suzhou), China

Santa Venera
 Orvieto, Italy

Senglea

 Cassino, Italy
 Zarasai, Lithuania

Siġġiewi
 Vittoria, Italy

Sliema

 Białystok, Poland
 Hartlepool, England, United Kingdom

Swieqi
 Taormina, Italy

T
Tarxien
 Veliko Tarnovo, Bulgaria

V
Valletta

 Cortona, Italy
 Palermo, Italy
 Piran, Slovenia
 Pisa, Italy
 Rhodes, Greece

Victoria
 Nichelino, Italy

X
Xagħra

 Chevaigné, France
 Cisano Bergamasco, Italy
 Kunszentmiklós, Hungary
 Offida, Italy

Xewkija

 Castelvenere, Italy
 Modica, Italy
 Pachino, Italy

Xgħajra

 Colletorto, Italy
 Pelplin, Poland

Z
Żabbar

 Eschborn, Germany
 Villabate, Italy

Żebbuġ
 Agira, Italy

Żebbuġ, Gozo
 Maletto, Italy

Żejtun

 Celano, Italy
 Tocina, Spain

Żurrieq

 Angermünde, Germany
 Borgo Maggiore, San Marino
 Morphou, Cyprus

References

Malta
Malta geography-related lists
Foreign relations of Malta
 
Populated places in Malta